Bely Yar is a selo in Beloyarovsky Selsoviet of Zavitinsky District, Amur Oblast, Russia. The population was 165 as of 2018. There are ten streets.

Geography 
Bely Yar is located on the left bank of the Zavitaya River, 26 km northwest of Zavitinsk (the district's administrative centre) by road. Novomikhaylovka is the nearest rural locality.

References 

Rural localities in Zavitinsky District